The Ren'Py Visual Novel Engine is a free software game engine which facilitates the creation of visual novels.

Features 
Ren'Py includes the ability to create branching stories, save file systems, rollback to previous points in the story, a variety of scene transitions, DLC, and so on. The engine also allows for movie playback for both full-screen movies and animated sprites, in-engine animation (using the built in "Animation and Translation Language", or ATL), and full animation and customization of UI elements via "Screen Language". Ren'Py scripts have a screenplay-like syntax, and can also include blocks of Python code to allow advanced users to add new features of their own. In addition, tools are included in the engine distribution to obfuscate scripts and archive game assets to mitigate copyright infringement.

Ren'Py is built on pygame, which is built with Python on SDL. The Ren'Py SDK is officially supported on Windows, recent versions of macOS, and Linux; and can be installed via the package managers of the Arch Linux, Ubuntu, Debian, and Gentoo (in experimental overlay) Linux distributions. Ren'Py can build games for Windows, macOS, Linux, Android, OpenBSD, iOS, and HTML5 with WebAssembly.

Reception 
Ren'Py has been recommended as a video game creation engine by several outlets, including Indie Games Plus, MakeUseOf, and The Guardian. It has been used in classes at Carnegie Mellon School of Art, Faculty of Art at University Tunku Abdul Rahman, Kampar, Perak, Malaysia, and as a tool for information literacy.

Notable games

See also 

 List of visual novel engines

References 
Notes

Citations

External links 

 
 Ren'Py Games List

Computer-related introductions in 2004
2004 software
Free game engines
Free software programmed in Python
Free software that uses SDL
Python (programming language)-scriptable game engines
 
Software development kits
Software using the MIT license
Video game development software
Video game engines
Visual novel engines